The Prophetic Herbie Nichols Vol. 2 is an album by jazz pianist Herbie Nichols featuring performances recorded and released on the Blue Note label in 1955 as a 10 inch LP.

Reception
Although originally unheralded at the time of release Nichol's Blue Note recordings have gained recognition as highly original and ground-breaking compositions and performances. The Allmusic review by Scott Yanow awarded Nichols' The Complete Blue Note Recordings, released in 1997, a five star rating and stated "The music is virtually unclassifiable, and although largely straight-ahead, sounds unlike anything produced by Herbie Nichols' contemporaries. Essential music".<ref name="Allmusic">Yanow, S. [ Allmusic Review: The Complete Blue Note Recordings: Herbie Nichols] accessed November 30, 2010</ref>  

Track listingAll compositions by Herbie NicholsSide A "Amoeba's Dance" - 4:29
 "Crisp Day" - 3:43
 "2300 Skiddoo" - 4:29Side B''
 "It Didn't Happen" - 5:10
 "Shuffle Montgomery" - 5:11
 "Brass Rings" - 5:28
Recorded at Rudy Van Gelder Studio, Hackensack, New Jersey on May 13, 1955

Personnel
Herbie Nichols - piano
Al McKibbon - bass
Art Blakey - drums

References

Blue Note Records albums
Herbie Nichols albums
1955 albums
Albums produced by Alfred Lion
Albums recorded at Van Gelder Studio